Jodi Myers (born 6 September 1973) is a South African cricketer. He played in three first-class matches for Boland from 1994/95 to 1996/97.

See also
 List of Boland representative cricketers

References

External links
 

1973 births
Living people
South African cricketers
Boland cricketers
Cricketers from Cape Town